Sinuijumantispa is an extinct genus of mantidflies from the Early Cretaceous Sinuiju Formation in North Korea.

References

Mantispidae
Prehistoric insect genera
Fossil taxa described in 2022